Andrew Colin Renfrew, Baron Renfrew of Kaimsthorn,  (born 25 July 1937) is a British archaeologist, paleolinguist and Conservative peer noted for his work on radiocarbon dating, the prehistory of languages, archaeogenetics, neuroarchaeology, and the prevention of looting at archaeological sites.

Renfrew was formerly the Disney Professor of Archaeology at the University of Cambridge and Director of the McDonald Institute for Archaeological Research and is now a Senior Fellow of the McDonald Institute for Archaeological Research.

Early life and education
Renfrew was educated at St Albans School, Hertfordshire (where one of the houses is named after him) and from 1956 to 1958 did National Service in the Royal Air Force. He then went up to St John's College, Cambridge, where he read Natural Sciences then Archaeology and Anthropology, graduating in 1962. He was elected president of Cambridge Union in 1961. In 1965, he completed his PhD thesis Neolithic and Bronze Age cultures of the Cyclades and their external relations; in the same year he married Jane M. Ewbank.

Academic

In 1965, Renfrew was appointed to the post of lecturer in the Department of Prehistory and Archaeology at the University of Sheffield. Between 1968 and 1970, he directed excavations at Sitagroi, Greece. In the 1968 Sheffield Brightside by-election he unsuccessfully contested this parliamentary constituency on behalf of the Conservative Party. In that year he was elected a Fellow of the Society of Antiquaries, in 1970 was elected Fellow of the Society of Antiquaries of Scotland and in 2000 elected an Honorary Fellow of the Society of Antiquaries of Scotland.

In 1972, Renfrew became Professor of Archaeology at the University of Southampton, succeeding Barry Cunliffe. During his time at Southampton he directed excavations at Quanterness in Orkney and Phylakopi on the island of Milos, Greece. In 1973, Renfrew published Before Civilisation: The Radiocarbon Revolution and Prehistoric Europe in which he challenged the assumption that prehistoric cultural innovation originated in the Near East and then spread to Europe. He also excavated with Marija Gimbutas at Sitagroi.

In 1980, Renfrew was elected a Fellow of the British Academy. In 1981 he was elected to the Disney Professorship of Archaeology in the University of Cambridge, a post he held until his retirement. In 1990 Renfrew was appointed as the founding Director of the McDonald Institute for Archaeological Research.

In 1987, he published Archaeology and Language: The Puzzle of the Indo-European Origins, a book on the Proto-Indo-Europeans. His "Anatolian hypothesis" posited that this group lived 2,000 years before the Kurgans, in Anatolia, later diffusing to Greece, then Italy, Sicily, Corsica, the Mediterranean coast of France, Spain, and Portugal. Another branch migrated along the fertile river valleys of the Danube and Rhine into central and northern Europe.

He developed the Anatolian hypothesis, which argues that Proto-Indo-European, the reconstructed ancestor of the Indo-European languages, originated approximately 9,000 years ago in Anatolia and moved with the spread of farming throughout the Mediterranean and into central and northern Europe. This hypothesis contradicted Marija Gimbutas's Kurgan hypothesis, which states that Proto-Indo-European was spread by a migration of peoples from the Pontic–Caspian steppe approximately 6,000 years ago.

From 1987 to 1991, he co-directed excavations at Markiani on Amorgos and at Dhaskalio Kavos, Keros, Greece.

Renfrew's work in using the archaeological record as the basis for understanding the ancient mind was foundational to the field of evolutionary cognitive archaeology. Renfrew and his student, Lambros Malafouris, coined the phrase neuroarchaeology to describe an archaeology of mind.

In 1996, Renfrew formulated a sapient paradox, that can be formulated as ""why there was such a long gap between emergence of genetically and anatomically modern humans and the development of complex behaviors?"

Renfrew served as Master of Jesus College, Cambridge from 1986 until 1997. In 2004, he retired from the Disney Professorship and is now a Senior Fellow at the McDonald Institute. From 2006 to 2008 he directed new excavations on the Cycladic Island of Keros, and is currently co-director of the Keros Island Survey.

Positions, awards and accolades
Fellow of the British Academy (1980)
Renfrew was created a life peer on 24 June 1991 as Baron Renfrew of Kaimsthorn, of Hurlet in the District of Renfrew.
Foreign Associate to the National Academy of Sciences of the USA 1996.
Balzan Prize, given in Prehistoric Archaeology for 2004.
Chair, Managing Council for the British School at Athens, since 2004.
Visiting Scholar, Cotsen Institute of Archaeology, UCLA, 2005–06.
Member of the American Philosophical Society since 2006.
Honorary degrees from the Universities of Sheffield, Athens, Southampton, Liverpool, Edinburgh, St Andrews, Kent, London and Lima.

Books
Renfrew, A.C., 1972, The Emergence of Civilisation: The Cyclades and the Aegean in The Third Millennium BC, London.
Renfrew, A.C., 1973, Before Civilisation, the Radiocarbon Revolution and Prehistoric Europe, London: Pimlico. 
 Renfrew, A.C. and Kenneth L. Cooke, eds. 1979 Transformations: Mathematical Approaches to Culture Change. New York: Academic Press. 
Renfrew, A.C. and Malcolm Wagstaff, eds., 1982,  An Island Polity, the Archaeology of Exploitation in Melos, Cambridge: Cambridge University Press.
Renfrew, Colin, 1984,  Approaches to Social Archeology, Edinburgh: Edinburgh University Press. 
Renfrew, A.C., ed. 1985,  The Archaeology of Cult, the Sanctuary at Phylakopi, London: British School at Athens / Thames & Hudson.
Colin Renfrew, Marija Gimbutas and Ernestine S. Elster, eds. 1986. Excavations at Sitagroi, a prehistoric village in northeast Greece. Vol. 1. Los Angeles : Institute of Archaeology, University of California.
Renfrew, A.C., 1987, Archaeology and Language: The Puzzle of Indo-European Origins, London: Pimlico. 
Renfrew, A.C. and Ezra B. W. Zubrow, eds. 1994, The ancient mind: elements of cognitive archaeology. Cambridge: Cambridge University Press. 
Renfrew, A.C. and Paul Bahn, 1991, Archaeology: Theories, Methods and Practice, London: Thames & Hudson. . (Sixth edition 2012)
 Renfrew, A.C., 2000, Loot, Legitimacy and Ownership: The Ethical Crisis in Archaeology, London: Duckworth. 
Renfrew, A.C., 2003, Figuring It Out: The Parallel Visions of Artists and Archaeologists, London: Thames & Hudson. 
Ernestine S. Elster and Colin Renfrew, eds., 2003. Prehistoric Sitagroi: Excavations in Northeast Greece, 1968–1970. Vol. 2: The Final Report. Los Angeles, CA: Cotsen Institute of Archaeology at UCLA. Monumenta archaeologica 20.
Renfrew, A.C., and Paul Bahn, eds. Archaeology: The Key Concepts. London: Routledge, 2005.
Renfrew, A.C., 2008, Prehistory: The Making of the Human Mind, Modern Library. 
Matsumura S., Forster P. and Renfrew C., eds., 2008, Simulations, Genetics and Human Prehistory, Cambridge: McDonald Institute for Archeological Research.

Articles
"Models of change in language and archaeology", Transactions of the Philological Society 87 (1989): 103–55.
"Archaeology, genetics and linguistic diversity", Man 27 (1992): 445–78.
"Time depth, convergence theory, and innovation in Proto-Indo-European: 'Old Europe' as a PIE linguistic area", Journal of Indo-European Studies 27 (1999): 257–93.
"'Indo-European' designates languages: not pots and not institutions", Antiquity 79 (2005): 692–5.
"Archaeogenetics", in Archaeology: The Key Concepts, eds. Colin Renfrew & Paul Bahn. London: Routledge, 2005, pp. 16–20.
"Phylogenetic network analysis of SARS-CoV-2 genomes", Proceedings of the National Academy of Sciences of the United States of America, April 8, 2020

See also
 Anatolian hypothesis
 Neuroarchaeology
 Evolutionary Cognitive Archaeology

References

External links
Renfrew's page at the McDonald Institute
Biographical interviews from Web of Stories (video)
Interview with Alan Macfarlane (video)
 (video)
Lecture on looting and illicit antiquities (MP3)

1937 births
Living people
People from St Albans
People from Stockton-on-Tees
People educated at St Albans School, Hertfordshire
Alumni of St John's College, Cambridge
Presidents of the Cambridge Union
English archaeologists
Academics of the University of Sheffield
Academics of the University of Southampton
British cognitive scientists
Fellows of Jesus College, Cambridge
Masters of Jesus College, Cambridge
Foreign associates of the National Academy of Sciences
Fellows of the British Academy
Foreign Members of the Russian Academy of Sciences
Fellows of the Society of Antiquaries of London
Conservative Party (UK) life peers
Paleolinguists
Disney Professors of Archaeology
Fellows of the Society of Antiquaries of Scotland
Archaeogeneticists
Members of the American Philosophical Society
Life peers created by Elizabeth II